Empat Lawang Regency is a regency of South Sumatra Province, Indonesia. It covers an area of  2,256.44 km² and had a population of 221,176 at the 2010 Census and 333,622 at the 2020 Census. The regency seat is Tebing Tinggi.

Administrative districts 

This Regency as at 2010 was administratively composed of seven districts (kecamatan). Since 2010 three additional districts have been created - Pendopo Barat (from part of Pendopo District), Sikap Dalam (from part of Ulu Musi District) and Saling (from part of Tebing Tinggi District). The ten districts are listed below with their areas (in km2) and their populations at the 2010 Census and 2020 Census. The table also includes the locations of the district administrative centres, the number of administrative villages (rural desa and urban kelurahan) in each and their post codes, are listed below:

Notes:
(a) The 2010 population of Pendopo Barat (West Pendopo) District is included in the figure for Pendopo District, from which it was later cut out.
(b) The 2010 population of Sikap Dalam District is included in the figure for Ulu Musi District, from which it was later cut out.
(c) The 2010 population of Saling District is included in the figure for Tebing Tinggi District, from which it was later cut out.

References

Regencies of South Sumatra